Ringøy is a small village in the municipality of Eidfjord in Hordaland county, Norway.

The settlement lies on the south side of the Eid Fjord, an inner branch of the Hardanger Fjord. The ferry quay at Ringøy served the ferry connection to Ulvik until 1938, when the quay on the south side of the fjord was relocated to Brimnes.

Norwegian National Road 13 passes through Ringøy. There is a campsite next to the fjord in the village.

References

Ullensvang